Historic Denbighshire is one of thirteen traditional counties in Wales, a vice-county and a former administrative county, which covers an area in north east Wales. It is a maritime county, bounded to the north by the Irish Sea, to the east by Flintshire, Cheshire and Shropshire, to the south by Montgomeryshire and Merionethshire, and to the west by Caernarfonshire.

Under the Local Government Act 1972, the use of Denbighshire for local government and ceremonial purposes ended on 1 April 1974, with the creation of the new county of Clwyd. A different county of the same name was created on 1 April 1996, for modern local government purposes, covering a substantially different area from the historic county.

History
Denbighshire was created by the Laws in Wales Acts 1535-1542 from areas previously in the Marches.  It was formed from Cantrefi taken as follows;

From the Lordship of Denbigh:

 Rhos
 Rhufoniog
 Dyffryn Clwyd

From Powys Fadog:

 Iâl
 Maelor Gymraeg
 Nanheudwy
 Cynllaith

Geography
The east is hilly. There is some level ground along the coastal strip. Pistyll-y-Rhaeader is a spectacular  waterfall. The chief rivers are the Clwyd and the Dee. The River Conwy runs north along the western boundary.

The main towns in the county are Rhyl, Abergele, Mochdre, Denbigh, Kinmel Bay, Llangollen, Llanrwst, Wrexham, Colwyn Bay and Ruthin. Villages such as Glan Conwy, Eglwysbach, and Llansannan also came under Denbighshire. The most important industries are agriculture and tourism.

Places of special interest
Bodnant Garden, Tal-y-Cafn; 
Chirk Castle; (now in Wrexham County Borough)
Denbigh Castle; 
Pillar of Eliseg; 
Plas Newydd, Llangollen; 
Valle Crucis Abbey, Llangollen.

Municipal reform

An administrative county of Denbighshire was created in 1889 by the Local Government Act 1888. The county was governed by an elected county council, who took over the functions of the Quarter Sessions courts. The county council was based at County Hall in Ruthin, a building which was designed by Walter Douglas Wiles and completed in March 1909.

The administrative county was subdivided into municipal boroughs and urban and rural districts.

The boroughs of Denbigh and Ruthin were reformed in 1835 by the Municipal Corporations Act 1835. The county's third borough, Wrexham was incorporated in 1857. Colwyn Bay urban district was incorporated in 1934.
Three urban districts were formed by the Local Government Act 1894: Abergele and Pensarn (renamed Abergele in 1935), Colwyn Bay and Colwyn (renamed Colwyn Bay in 1926, and incorporated as a borough in 1934) and Llangollen, as successors to urban sanitary districts. in 1897 Llanrwst urban district was formed.  
Eight rural districts were formed (also by the 1894 Act), based on existing rural sanitary districts: Chirk, Llangollen, Llanrwst, Llansillin, Ruthin, St Asaph (Denbigh), Uwchaled and Wrexham.

Two civil parishes: Llaneilian yn Rhos and Llansanffraid Glan Conway were administered as part of Conwy Rural District in the neighbouring county of Caernarfonshire.  This area was sometimes called Glan Conway Rural District.

In 1935 the rural districts were reorganised by a County Review Order, and reduced to five in number: Aled, Ceiriog, Hiraethog, Ruthin and Wrexham.

The administrative county was abolished in 1974, with most of its territory becoming part of the new districts of Colwyn, Wrexham Maelor and Glyndŵr in Clwyd. The urban district of Llanrwst and five rural parishes were included in Gwynedd.

See also
 Denbighshire
 List of Lord Lieutenants of Denbighshire
 List of Custodes Rotulorum of Denbighshire
 List of High Sheriffs of Denbighshire
 Denbighshire (UK Parliament constituency)

References

External links
Denbighshire genealogical information
Denbighshire archaeological information
Map of Denbighshire on Wikishire

Historic counties of Wales
 
States and territories established in 1535
1535 establishments in England